Richard Robinson may refer to:

Government
Richard Robinson (Municipal Reform politician) (1849–1928), English politician and chemist
Richard A. Robinson (born 1957), Justice of the Connecticut Supreme Court
Richard Earl Robinson (1903–1991), U.S. federal judge
Richard H. Robinson (California politician) (born 1943), California politician
Richard H. Robinson (New Mexico Attorney General), Attorney General of New Mexico from 1953 to 1956

Sports
Dicky Robinson (1927–2009), English footballer
Rich Robinson (Canadian football) (born 1946), Canadian football player
Richie Robinson (born 1946), Australian cricketer
Richard Robinson (cricketer) (1950–2002), English cricketer
Richard Robinson (chess player) (1956-2009), American and Bermudian chess player

Others
Richard Robinson (actor) (died 1648), English actor
Richard Robinson, 1st Baron Rokeby (1708–1794), Irish theologist
Richard Robinson (philosopher) (1902–1996), English secularist
Richard Robinson (Buddhism scholar) (1926-1970), Buddhism scholar
Richard Robinson (chief executive) (1937–2021), American chief executive officer of Scholastic Corporation
Richard Robinson (festival director) (born 1953), puppeteer based in the UK
Richard D. Robinson (educator) (1921–2009), American educator
Richard D. Robinson (engineer), American materials scientist
Richard Robinson (fashion designer), Canadian fashion designer
Rich Robinson (born 1969), American musician

See also
Richard Robson (disambiguation)